The Fauns are a British rock band that formed in 2007 in Bristol, England. The band consists of Alison Garner (vocals), Lee Woods (guitar/vocals), Elliot Guise (guitar), Michael Savage (bass) and Guy Davies (drums).

History
The band released their self-titled debut album on their own label, Laser Ghost Recordings. Despite the lack of a publicity campaign, they received support from disc jockey Steve Lamacq and their debut sold more than 5000 copies by "word of mouth." The band will be releasing their 2013 follow-up album, Lights, produced by band member Michael Savage and engineered by Tim Allen and Get the Blessing bassist Jim Barr, on 2 December 2013, via Invada Records.

The band's song, "Fragile" was remixed by English composer Clint Mansell. The remix was eventually released as a limited edition  single for Record Store Day.

The band opened for the French electronic music act College in 2013. They also toured with French post-rock/shoegaze band Alcest in early 2014 in Europe.

Members
Alison Garner - vocals
Michael Savage - bass
Lee Woods (Formally Spinelli) - guitar/vocals
Elliot Guise - guitar
Guy Davies - drums

Past Members
Tom Adams - drums
Kevin West - guitar
Olly Hares - guitar
Matthew O'Connor - keys
 Martin Hommel - bass

Discography
Studio albums
The Fauns (2009, Laser Ghost Recordings)
Lights (2013, Invada Records)

Singles	
"Fragile Clint Mansell Mix" / "The Sun Is Cruising Redg Weeks Re-work" (Record Store Day 12" 2013, Invada Records)
"Power Glove 'EP II' MINI-LP" features 4AM Power Glove Remix' (2015, Invada Records)

Music videos
"Lovestruck" (2009, directed by Chris Lucas)
"1991" (2010, directed by Chris Lucas)
"Fragile Clint Mansell Mix" (2013, directed by Jonny Clooney)
"Seven Hours" (2013, directed by John Minton)
"Lights" (2013, directed by Chris Lucas)
"4AM" (2014, directed by Tia Salisbury)

References

External links

Musical groups established in 2007
English indie rock groups
Dream pop musical groups
British shoegaze musical groups
Musical groups from Bristol
English rock music groups
Musical quintets